Sarawak Malay (Standard Malay: Bahasa Melayu Sarawak or Bahasa Sarawak, Jawi: بهاس ملايو سراوق, Sarawak Malay: Kelakar Sarawak) is a Malayic language native to the State of Sarawak. It is a common language used by natives of Sarawak. This variant is related to Bruneian Malay, spoken in the districts of Limbang and Lawas (Sarawak) and bears strong similarities with Sanggau, Sintang and Sekadau Malay spoken in the northern part of the West Kalimantan province in Indonesia. There is some debate on whether it is a vernacular variety of Malay or a separate language altogether. It is more similar to Ibanic languages compared to the Malay dialects of Sumatra and the Malayan Peninsula, and is different enough from standard Malay that speakers outside of Sarawak are often unable to understand it without prior study..

Dialects 
According to Asmah Haji Omar (1993), Sarawak Malay can be divided into three dialects which are:

 Kuching
 Saribas 
 Sibu

Features 
Sarawak Malay has features that are not found in Standard Malay, of which some of them are closer to colloquial Indonesian:

 Verbs conjugated in the "agent focus" sense (e.g. biar > membiar) conjugate differently in Sarawak Malay:
 In Sarawak Malay, the initial consonant in a syllable coda of the conjugated form of the word (e.g. the initial middle 'm' in memberi) in Standard Malay is the initial consonant in Sarawak Malay mencari [məɲ.t͡ʃa.ri] is nyari [ɲ̩a.ɣi] because the 'n' in mencari is a [ɲ]. This is also found in how memberi [məm.bə.ri] is meri [mə.ɣi] in Sarawak Malay because of the middle 'm' in memberi.
 In the Kuching dialect and the Sibu dialect, open-ended final /a/ is an [a] just like in Standard Malay but in the Saribas dialect, it is instead an [o] so ada /ada/ is [a.da] in the Kuching and SIbu dialects and in Standard Malay but is pronounced as [a.do] in the Saribas dialect.
 In Sarawak Malay, /r/ is an uvular or velar fricative ([ʁ] and [ɣ] respectively), unlike in Standard Malay where it is an alveolar trill [r].

Vocabulary 

Sarawak Malay has a rich vocabulary of which many words, while also found in Standard Malay, have completely different meanings.

The numbers of Sarawak Malay differ a bit from their Standard Malay counterparts.

The pronouns too differ quite significantly, with 1st and 2nd personal pronouns (both singular and plural) are both derived from 1st person plural pronouns (kami and kita in Standard Malay).

Below is a non-exhaustive list of lexical differences between Standard Malay and Sarawak Malay.

Many of the words used in Sarawak Malay nowadays were borrowed from many languages such as English. Some English words that have been borrowed and have undergone significant pronunciation changes are as follows:

Word formation

The word formation rules of Sarawak Malay are very different from those of the standard Malay language. Without prior exposure, most West Malaysians have trouble following Sarawakian conversations. Sabahan is also different from Sarawak Malay, however they do share some lexicon, such as the word Bah, which is used to stress a sentence. E.g.: Don't do like that - "Iboh polah kedak ya bah." It is similar in use to "lah" in Singlish and in West Malaysia. E.g.: Don't do like that 'lah'. Some words in Sarawakian Malay have a similar pronunciation of ai as ei, as in some districts of Perak: serai > serei, kedai > kedei. Some Sarawakian Malay verbs have a final glottal stop after a vowel or in place of final /r/: kena > kenak, air > aik, beri > berik. like in the Aboriginal Malay languages of West Malaysia.

Many words in Sarawak Malay diverge from the original pronunciation and some are totally different. E.g.:

Colloquial and contemporary usage 

Contemporary usage of Bahasa Sarawak includes contemporary Malay words or incorporated from other languages, spoken by the urban speech community, which may not be familiar to the older generation. E.g.: SMS language. E.g.:

References

External links 
 Kaipuleohone has an archived notes on Sarawak Malay

Agglutinative languages
Sarawak
Languages of Malaysia
Malay dialects
Malayic languages